Richard Andreas Werner (born 5 January 1967) is a German banking and development economist who is a university professor at University of Winchester.

He has proposed the "Quantity Theory of Credit", or "Quantity Theory of Disaggregated Credit", which disaggregates credit creation used for the real economy (GDP transactions) on the one hand, and financial transactions on the other hand. In 1995, he proposed a new monetary policy to swiftly deal with banking crises, which he called 'Quantitative Easing', published in the Nikkei. He also first used the expression "QE2" in public, referring to the need to implement 'true quantitative easing' as an expansion in credit creation.<ref>Richard Werner, "Keizai Kyoshitsu: Keiki kaifuku, ryoteiki kinyu kanwa kara," Nikkei, 2 September 1995. ‘QE2’ was first used publicly by Richard Werner live on CNBC on 22 September 2009. He argued that 'true quantitative easing' was needed, namely an expansion in productive credit creation. This required a second attempt by central banks, "a kind of QE2". Squawkbox, CNBC, live studio panel, 18:00-21:00 hrs London time, 22 September 2009. Meanwhile, the expression is today mainly used to refer to a second round of what Prof. Werner would consider the 'wrong type' of QE.</ref> His 2001 book 'Princes of the Yen' was a number one general bestseller in Japan. In 2014 he published the first empirical evidence that each bank creates credit when it issues a new loan.

Early life
In 1989, Werner earned a BSc in economics at the London School of Economics (LSE).  During his postgraduate studies at Oxford University he spent over a year in Japan, studying at the University of Tokyo and working at the Nomura Research Institute. His DPhil in economics was conferred by Oxford. In 1991, he became European Commission-sponsored Marie Curie Fellow at the Institute for Economics and Statistics at Oxford. His 1991 discussion paper at the institute warned about the imminent 'collapse' of the Japanese banking system and the threat of the "greatest recession since the Great Depression". In Tokyo, he also became the first Shimomura Fellow at the Research Institute for Capital Formation at the Development Bank of Japan.  He was a visiting researcher at the Institute for Monetary and Economic Studies at the Bank of Japan; and he was a visiting scholar at the Institute for Monetary and Fiscal Studies at the Ministry of Finance.

Career
Werner was chief economist of Jardine Fleming from 1994 to 1998 and published several articles on the Japanese credit cycle and monetary policy, many of which are in Japanese. He joined the faculty of Sophia University in Tokyo (1997-2004) as a tenured assistant professor. Werner was senior managing director and senior portfolio manager at Bear Stearns Asset Management. He worked at the University of Southampton (2004-2018), mainly as Chair and Professor in International Banking. Werner becomes Professor of Banking and Finance at De Montfort University in 2018. He is the founding director of the university's Centre for Banking, Finance and Sustainable Development and organiser of the European Conference on Banking and the Economy (ECOBATE), first held on 29 September 2011 in Winchester Guildhall, with Lord Adair Turner, FSA Chairman, as keynote speaker. From 2011 to 2019, he was a member of the ECB Shadow Council.

Werner has developed a theory of money creation called the Quantity Theory of Credit, which is in line with Schumpeter's credit theory of money. He has argued, since 1992, that the banking sector needs to be reflected appropriately in macroeconomic models since it is the main creator and allocator of the money supply, through the process of credit creation by individual banks.

Werner's book Princes of the Yen, about the modern economic development of Japan, including the bubble of the 1990s and subsequent bust, was a number one general bestseller in Japan in 2001.  The book covers the monetary policy of the Bank of Japan specifically and central bank informal guidance of bank credit in general.

Werner proposed a policy he called "quantitative easing" in Japan in 1994 and 1995. At the time working as chief economist of Jardine Fleming Securities (Asia) Ltd. in Tokyo, he used this expression during presentations to institutional investors in Tokyo. It is also, among others, in the title of an article he published on September 2, 1995, in the Nihon Keizai Shinbun (Nikkei). According to Werner, he used this phrase in order to propose a new form of monetary stimulation policy by the central bank that relied neither on interest rate reductions (which Werner claimed in his Nikkei article would be ineffective) nor on the conventional monetarist policy prescription of expanding the money supply (e.g. through "printing money", expanding high-powered money, expanding bank reserves or boosting deposit aggregates such as M2 –all of which Werner also claimed would be ineffective). Instead, Werner argued, it was necessary and sufficient for an economic recovery to boost "credit creation", through a number of measures. He also suggested direct purchases of non-performing assets from the banks by the central bank; direct lending to companies and the government by the central bank; purchases of commercial paper, other debt, and equity instruments from companies by the central bank; and stopping the issuance of government bonds to fund the public sector borrowing requirement, instead having the government borrow directly from banks through a standard loan contract.Richard A. Werner, New Paradigm in Macroeconomics: Solving the Riddle of Japanese Macroeconomic Performance, Basingstoke: Palgrave Macmillan

Werner is founding director and chairman of Local First Community Interest Company, which promotes the establishment of not-for-profit local community banks, modelled on the successful German local co-operative, Raiffeisen and Sparkasse savings banks that have enabled German small firms to become top exporters and job creators in Germany.

In 2019, Werner took out a discrimination case against his employer, Southampton University, claiming he was discriminated against and ‘victimised’ in a ‘harassment and bullying’ campaign for being German and Christian, during his 14 years career at the university.  The £2.5m payout was one of the largest awards ever made by a British tribunal and was so high because the university failed to defend itself. In July 2019, after a successful appeal by the University, the judgement was set aside and the case was set to proceed in the usual fashion. Werner was then, in August 2020, granted permission to appeal the decision in the Employment Appeal Tribunal. In the meantime Werner brought a discrimination claim against the University of Cambridge after they withdrew a conditional offer of employment in 2018.

Selected works
Books
 
 Neue Wirtschaftspolitik, München: Vahlen Verlag (2007) - New Economic Policy, Munich: Vahlen Publishing House (2007)
 New Paradigm in Macroeconomics: Solving the Riddle of Japanese Macroeconomic Performance (2005) 
 Princes of the Yen: Japan's central bankers and the transformation of the economy (2001) 2nd edition 2018 by Quantum Publishers 
 『虚構の終焉』 = Towards a new macroeconomic paradigm. Tokyo: PHP. (2003)
 『謎解き!平成大不況 : 誰も語らなかった「危機」の本質』 = The enigma of the great recession (2003)
 Three essays on Japanese macroeconomic policy in the 1980s and 1990s (2006)
 『福井日銀・危険な素顔』 =　The Bank of Japan under Toshihiko Fukui, with M. Ishii. Tokyo: Appuru Shuppan. (2003)
 『不景気が終わらない本当の理由』 =　Central Banking and Structural Changes in Japan and Europe. Tokyo: Soshisha. (2003)
 Dismantaling the Japanese Model, with M. Kikkawa. Tokyo: Kodansha. (2003)
 Princes of the Yen, Japan's Central Bankers and the Transformation of the Economy. New York: M.E. Sharpe.
 『円の支配者』. Tokyo: Soshisha (2001)

Chapters
 1998 – "Bank of Japan window guidance and the creation of the bubble," in: Rodao, F. and A. Lopez Santos (eds.), El Japon Contemporaneo, Salamanca: University of Salamanca Press
 2002 – "Macroeconomic Management in Thailand: The Policy-induced Crisis," in: Rhee, G.S. (eds.), Rising to the Challenge in Aisa: A Study of Financial Markets, Vol. II, Thailand, Manila: Asian Development Bank
 2006 – "The relationship between interest rates and economic activity: How the conventional literature has dealt with the Japanese experience," in: Batten, J.A., Fetherston, T.A. and Szilagyi, P.G. (eds.), Japanese Fixed Income Markets: Money, Bond and Interest Rate Derivatives, Amsterdam: Elsevier (pp. 135–170)
 2007 – "Europe’s choice and lessons from Japan: supply vs. demand policy, fiscal vs. monetary policy," in: Terzi, A. and J. Bibow (eds.), Euroland and the World Economy: Global Player or Global Drag, Basingstoke: Palgrave Macmillan
 2007 – "The cause of Japan’s recession and the lessons for the world," in: Bailey, Coffey and Tomlinson (eds), Crisis or Recovery: Industry and State in Japan. Cheltenham: Edward Elgar
 2008 –  "Was sind die Voraussetzungen fuer ein gesundes Wirtschaftswachstum ohne Bankenprobleme?," in: Carl Spaengler KAG (ed.), 20 Fragen zur Geldanlage''. Salzburg: Carl Spaengler Kapitalanlagegesellschaft mbH.

 Journals
 1994 – 
 1997 – 
 2002 – 
 2003 – 
 2003 – 
 2003 – 
 2004 – 
 2009 – 
 2011 – 
 2011 – 
 2011 – 
 2012 - 
 2012 - 
 2013 - 
 2013 - 
 2014 - 
 2014 - 
 2015 - 
 2016 - 
 2016 - 
 2018 - 
 2018 - 

 Papers
 1991 – "The Great Yen Illusion: Japanese Capital Flows and the Role of Land," Oxford Applied Economics Discussion Paper Series, Oxford: Institute of Economics and Statistics, University of Oxford, No. 129, December
 1993 – "Towards a quantity theorem of disaggregated credit and international capital flows," Paper presented at the Royal Economic Society Annual Conference, York, April 1993
 2010 – Comment on Range of Methodologies for Risk and Performance Alignment of Remuneration [in the banking sector], official submission to public call for comments on ‘Range of Methodologies for Risk and Performance Alignment of Remuneration, Consultative Document’ by the Basel Committee on Banking Supervision, 14 October 2010, submitted 31 December 2010.
 2010 – Towards Stable and Competitive Banking in the UK - Evidence for the ICB, submitted to the Independent Commission on Banking, UK (Chair: Professor Sir John Vickers), submitted 19 November 2010
 2010 – Towards a Twenty-First Century Banking and Monetary System, Joint Submission to the Independent Commission on Banking, UK (Chair: Professor Sir John Vickers), with Ben Dyson, Tony Greenham, Josh Ryan-Collins, by the Centre for Banking, Finance and Sustainable Development, the new economics foundation, and Positive Money, submitted 19 November 2010 PDF
 2010 – Comment on Strengthening the Resilience of the Banking Sector, official submission to public call for comments on ‘Strengthening the Resilience of the Banking Sector, Consultative Document’ by the Basel Committee on Banking Supervision, September 2009. Submitted 16 April 2010; published by the Bank for International Settlements, Basel.

Honors
 2003 – World Economic Forum in Davos, "Global Leader for Tomorrow"

References

External links
 Official site

Academics of the University of Southampton
German economists
Living people
Monetary reformers
1967 births
Academics of De Montfort University